Purva Rana  (born 12 February 1988) is a model and an Indian beauty pageant titleholder who participated in Femina Miss India 2012 pageant. She also competed in Miss United Continents 2013 and was crowned as Vice Queen United Continent 2013 on 14 September 2013. She was also placed as first Runner up at Miss Tourism 2012 pageant.

Early life
Born in Himachal Pradesh, India. Rana speaks Hindi and English. She was a student of Electronic engineering at Himachal Pradesh Technical University.

Pageants
She also won Miss Himachal crown in 2010.

On 19 December 2012 Rana represented India at the Miss Tourism 2012 pageant in Bangkok, Thailand. She placed as first runner-up.

On 14 September 2013 Rana was crowned as Vice Queen United Continent 2013 pageant in Guayaquil, Ecuador.

Filmography

References

External links
Official Miss United Continent website
Official Miss Femina India website

1991 births
Living people
People from Kangra district